Dissociation in chemistry is a general process in which molecules (or ionic compounds such as salts, or complexes) separate or split into other things such as atoms, ions, or radicals, usually in a reversible manner. For instance, when an acid dissolves in water, a covalent bond between an electronegative atom and a hydrogen atom is broken by heterolytic fission, which gives a proton (H+) and a negative ion. Dissociation is the opposite of association or recombination.

Dissociation constant

For reversible dissociations in a chemical equilibrium
AB <=> A + B
the dissociation constant Kd is the ratio of dissociated to undissociated compound

where the brackets denote the equilibrium concentrations of the species.

Dissociation degree
The dissociation degree  is the fraction of original solute molecules that have dissociated. It is usually indicated by the Greek symbol α. More accurately, degree of dissociation refers to the amount of solute dissociated into ions or radicals per mole. In case of very strong acids and bases, degree of dissociation will be close to 1. Less powerful acids and bases will have lesser degree of dissociation. There is a simple relationship between this parameter and the van 't Hoff factor . If the solute substance dissociates into  ions, then

For instance, for the following dissociation
KCl <=> K+ + Cl-

As , we would have that .

Salts

The dissociation of salts by solvation in a solution, such as water, means the separation of the anions and cations. The salt can be recovered by evaporation of the solvent.

An electrolyte refers to a substance that contains free ions and can be used as an electrically conductive medium. Most of the solute does not dissociate in a weak electrolyte, whereas in a strong electrolyte a higher ratio of solute dissociates to form free ions.

A weak electrolyte is a substance whose solute exists in solution mostly in the form of molecules (which are said to be "undissociated"), with only a small fraction in the form of ions. Simply because a substance does not readily dissolve does not make it a weak electrolyte. Acetic acid and ammonium are good examples. Acetic acid is extremely soluble in water, but most of the compound dissolves into molecules, rendering it a weak electrolyte. Weak bases and weak acids are generally weak electrolytes.

A strong electrolyte is a solute that exists in solution completely or nearly completely as ions. Again, the strength of an electrolyte is defined as the percentage of solute that is ions, rather than molecules. The higher the percentage, the stronger the electrolyte. Thus, even if a substance is not very soluble, but does dissociate completely into ions, the substance is defined as a strong electrolyte. Similar logic applies to a weak electrolyte. These will all exist as ions in an aqueous medium.

Gases
The degree of dissociation in gases is denoted by the symbol , where  refers to the percentage of gas molecules which dissociate. The example of dinitrogen tetroxide dissociating to nitrogen dioxide will be taken.
N2O4 <=> 2NO2

The equilibrium constant (in terms of pressure) is given by the equation

where  represents the partial pressure.

This equation is in accordance with Le Chatelier's Principle.  will remain constant with temperature. The addition of pressure to the system will increase the value of  so  must decrease to keep  constant. In fact, increasing the pressure of the equilibrium favours a shift to the left favouring the formation of dinitrogen tetroxide (as on this side of the equilibrium there is less pressure since pressure is proportional to number of moles) hence decreasing the extent of dissociation

Acids in aqueous solution

The reaction of an acid in water solvent is often described as a dissociation
HA <=> H+ + A-
where HA is a proton acid such as acetic acid, CH3COOH. The double arrow means that this is an equilibrium process, with dissociation and recombination occurring at the same time. This implies that the acid dissociation constant

However a more accurate description is provided by the Brønsted–Lowry acid–base theory, which specifies that the proton H+ does not exist as such in solution but is instead accepted by (bonded to) a water molecule to form the hydronium ion H3O+.

The reaction is therefore more correctly written as
HA + H2O <=> H3O+ + A-
and better described as an ionization or formation of ions (for the case when HA has no net charge). The equilibrium constant is then

where [H_2O] is not included because in dilute solution the solvent is essentially a pure liquid with a thermodynamic activity of one.

Ka is variously named a dissociation constant, an acid ionization constant, an acidity constant or an ionization constant. It serves as an indicator of the acid strength: stronger acids have a higher Ka value (and a lower pKa value).

Fragmentation
Fragmentation of a molecule can take place by a process of heterolysis or homolysis.

Receptors
Receptors are proteins that bind small ligands. The dissociation constant Kd is used as indicator of the affinity of the ligand to the receptor. The higher the affinity of the ligand for the receptor the lower the Kd value (and the higher the pKd value).

See also
Bond-dissociation energy
Photodissociation, dissociation of molecules by photons (light, gamma rays, x-rays)
Radiolysis, dissociation of molecules by ionizing radiation
Thermal decomposition

References

Chemical processes
Equilibrium chemistry